The Central District of Bastak County is a district (bakhsh) in Bastak County, Hormozgan Province, Iran. At the 2006 census, its population was 30,399, in 6,281 families.  The District has one city: Bastak.  The District has three rural districts (dehestan): Deh Tall Rural District, Fatuyeh Rural District, and Godeh Rural District.

References 

Districts of Hormozgan Province
Bastak County